Hassan Alaa Eddin, commonly known as Chouchou or Shoushou (Arabic: شوشو) (26 February 1939 – 2 January 1975), was a Lebanese actor/singer/comedian.

Born in Joun, he founded the national theater, and wrote and played in many TV movies. He also composed and sang children's songs and wrote such plays as Alef B Boubeye, Shehadin Ya Baladna and Nana il Hilwe.

Death
Hassan Alaa Eddin died, aged 35, from a heart disease.

References

1939 births
1975 deaths
20th-century Lebanese male actors
20th-century Lebanese male singers
Lebanese songwriters
Lebanese male television actors